amakihi may refer to the following species of bird:

 Hawaii amakihi or common amakihi (Chlorodrepanis virens)
 Oahu amakihi (Chlorodrepanis flavus)
 Kauai amakihi (Chlorodrepanis kauaiensis)
 Greater amakihi (Viridonia sagittirostris)